Rimi Nique is a Thai-Indian singer-songwriter known for her appearance on the show The Voice Thailand Season 2 (2013), performing 'Lady Marmalade", India's Raw Star (2014), and The Stage (2015). She made her debut as a lyricist and playback singer in the Bollywood music industry with the song "Naach Meri Jaan" that was featured in the movie Any Body Can Dance 2. She is versatile, being able to sing in six different languages: Hindi, English, Punjabi, Thai, and Spanish.

Rimi Nique won ’Best Pop Artist" Radio City Freedom Awards 4 (2016), with Sanket Sane, on her track ‘On a High Zindagi’

Rimi Nique wrote and sang 'Shilong Harvest Song' in the Sony album "Silence Is a Bliss" with Indian flautist Naveen Kumar, and drummer Sivamani in 2015. The same year she also sang "Sunny Sunny The Workout Song" for Sunny Leone's workout video with the singer Darshan Raval.

Rimi Nique worked as a lyricist and singer is the song "Saasain huin dhuan dhuan" featured in the Race 3 movie franchise (2018)

Rimi Nique joins hands with DJ Bravo for a new single called 'The Chamiya Song'(2019) as a lyricist and singer along with composer/singer Gaurav Dagaonkar. The song also features Shakti Mohan and is choreographed by Rahul Shetty.On sharing her working experience with Bravo, “Bravo is always looking out for me, making me feel respected and safe and I couldn’t have asked for a better friend to collaborate with.”

“It’s been the smoothest and most comfortable experience, feels like family, working on a song with my big brother/ best buddy. We have performed together in Dubai once last year, and we connected instantly! We knew we wanted to work on a song together, and we finally found time to reconnect when he was back in Mumbai for IPL. Once I made him hear the Chamiya song, he was hooked, and I realized right then that I had to write a part for him in the song to make this happen and the rest was history!”

Personal life
Born and raised in Thailand, to Gurvinder Singh Doowa and Dalvinder Kaur Doowa, she is the eldest daughter with two younger siblings. Rimi is based in Mumbai and Bangkok, while her family resides in Thailand. She completed her schooling in 2008 from Ruamrudee International School (RIS), Bangkok, where she was part of the Jeremiah Singers choir. She majored in economics and environmental studies with a music minor at Whitman College in Washington State, where she was part of the A-Capella group ‘Schwa’. She started the band "Dabbles in Bloom" with Adriel Borshansky, Robby Seager, and Jonas Myers. Their first album, "Found It", was released in July 2010, followed by a tour in the Pacific North West.

Discography

References

External links
 

Living people
1990 births
Rimi Nique
Rimi Nique